John William Magaw (born 1935) is a former administrator for the United States Federal Government. He received a Bachelor of Science degree in education from Otterbein College, in Westerville, Ohio in 1957. He began his career in public service in 1959 as a state trooper with the Ohio State Highway Patrol.

Magaw became a special agent with the United States Secret Service in 1967. While he was at the Secret Service he served as deputy special agent in charge of the Vice Presidential protective division and head of the Washington field office. By 1992, Magaw was in charge of all protective operations for the President and First family. Magaw was Director of the United States Secret Service from 1992 to 1993.

The Waco siege in 1993 did not reflect well on the Bureau of Alcohol, Tobacco, and Firearms (ATF). After an investigation, U.S. Secretary of the Treasury purged its senior leadership and appointed Magaw as its fourth director.  Morale in the agency improved during his tenure from 1993 to 1999.

Magaw was appointed senior advisor to the director of the Federal Emergency Management Agency (FEMA) for terrorism preparedness in December 1999. In that role, he planned and coordinated FEMA's domestic terrorism preparedness efforts. He later served as acting director from January 20, 2001, to February 15, 2001. After Joe Allbaugh's confirmation to FEMA director, Magaw held other positions within FEMA.

U.S. Secretary of Transportation Norman Mineta, and his deputy, chose Magaw to stand up the new Transportation Security Administration, for his law enforcement experience and successful leadership of ATF. President George W. Bush agreed, and in January 2002 the U.S. Senate confirmed Magaw as Under Secretary of Transportation Security.  He oversaw the initial standup of the TSA.  His tough approach to airport security produced long lines and inconvenience for travelers, angering stakeholders.  Not allowing pilots to arm themselves also sparked controversy.  He didn't cultivate his public image, nor tend to relations with the U.S. Congress. He left TSA in June 2002, with former United States Coast Guard Admiral James Loy replacing him. Magaw lasted six months at TSA; his successor lasted ten months.

Magaw received the Presidential Rank Meritorious Award in 1991 and 1999, as well as the Presidential Rank Distinguished Award in 1995.

, Magaw is a member of the Homeland Security Advisory Council.

References

External links

|-

|-

|-

1935 births
Living people
American state police officers
ATF agents
Clinton administration personnel
Directors of the Bureau of Alcohol, Tobacco, Firearms and Explosives
Directors of the United States Secret Service
Federal Emergency Management Agency officials
George H. W. Bush administration personnel
George W. Bush administration personnel
Ohio State Highway Patrol
Otterbein University alumni
People from Columbus, Ohio
Transportation Security Administration officials
United States Department of Transportation officials
United States Secret Service agents